The Sikorsky S-16, or RBVZ S-XVI (named after its manufacturer), was a Russian equi-span single-bay two-seat biplane designed by Igor Sikorsky in 1914-15. Conceived in response to demand for an escort fighter for the Ilya Muromets bombers, it was noteworthy in that it was one of the first aircraft to possess synchronisation gear for its 7.7 mm machine gun. The first S-XVI was completed on 6 February 1915 with an 80 hp engine instead of the intended 100 hp because of supply problems. On 17 December 1915, the Russian government placed an order for 18 aircraft, these being delivered in early 1916.

Operational history

Although highly maneuverable, the S-XVI possessed a comparatively poor performance due to insufficient power. A further small batch were completed in 1917, with the aircraft being used during the Russian Revolution and staying in service until 1923. At least one aircraft have been used by the Ukrainian People's Republic after 1917.

Operators

Imperial Russian Air Service

Soviet Air Forces

Ukrainian People's Republic Air Fleet

Specifications

References

Bibliography
 William Green and  Gordon Swanborough. The Complete Book of Fighters.  Colour Library Direct, Godalming, UK: 1994. .

External links

1910s Russian fighter aircraft
S-016
Single-engined tractor aircraft
Rotary-engined aircraft
Biplanes
Aircraft first flown in 1915